For information on all University of Maine sports, see Maine Black Bears.

The Maine Black Bears football program is the intercollegiate American football team for the University of Maine located in the U.S. state of Maine. The team competes in the NCAA Division I Football Championship Subdivision (FCS) and are members of the Colonial Athletic Association. Maine's first football team was fielded in 1892. The team plays its home games at the 8,419 seat Alfond Stadium in Orono, Maine.

History

Conference affiliations 
1892: Independent
1893–1946: Maine Intercollegiate Athletic Association
1947–96: Yankee Conference
1997–2006: Atlantic 10 Conference
2007–present: Colonial Athletic Association

Playoffs
The Black Bears have appeared in the Division I-AA/FCS Playoffs eight times. They have a 5–8 record in playoff games.

Bowl games
Maine has participated in one bowl game. Their record is 0–1.

Conference championships 
Maine has won thirteen conference championships, seven shared and six outright.

† – Conference co-champions

Rivalries

New Hampshire Wildcats

Notable former players
Notable alumni include:

 Sherrod Baltimore
 Jovan Belcher
 Mike Buck
 Accie Connor
 Stephen Cooper
 Jamil Demby
 Mike DeVito
 Nick DiPaolo
 Mike Flynn
 Brian Gaine
 John Huard
 Dan Jones
 Phil McGeoghan
 Brandon McGowan
 Kevin McMahan
 Kendall James
 Justin Perillo
 Jerron McMillian
 Matthew Mulligan
 Christophe Mulumba-Tshimanga
 Montell Owens
 Jim Reid
 Jeff Reinebold
 Patrick Ricard
 Ben Sirmans
 Justin Strzelczyk
 Lofa Tatupu

Future non-conference opponents 
Announced schedules as of December 12, 2022.

References

External links

 

 
American football teams established in 1892
1892 establishments in Maine